Venevisión is a Venezuelan television network which is a parent company of Grupo Cisneros founded in 1953 by Gustavo Cisneros.

La cruz del diablo was the first telenovela produced by the network.

1960s

1960
 La cruz del diablo
 El velo pintado

1965
 Madres solteras
 Yo, el Gobernador

1966
 Dulce María

1967
 La señorita Elena
 La muñeca brava
 Lucecita
 Doña Bárbara
 La rival

1968
 El reportero
 La Gata
 La virgen de Barlovento
 Rosario

1969
 Abandonada
 Pablo y Alicia
 Soledad

1970s

1980s

1990s

2000s

2010s

References

External links
 Venevisión [ve] at Internet Movie Database
 Venevision International [us]  at Internet Movie Database

Venevision
 
Venevision telenovelas